The third USS Porpoise (SS-7) was an early  in the service of the United States Navy, later renamed as A-6.

She was laid down on 13 December 1900 in Elizabeth, New Jersey at the Crescent Shipyard under the direction of shipyard superintendent, Arthur Leopold Busch. This craft was launched on 23 September 1901, and commissioned at the Holland Torpedo Boatyard at New Suffolk, New York on 19 September 1903.

Early service
Assigned initially to the Naval Torpedo Station at Newport for experimental torpedo firing work, Porpoise entered the New York Navy Yard in September 1904 for repairs and alterations, remaining there until February 1906. Assigned then to the First Torpedo Flotilla on 7 March 1907, she operated at Annapolis, Maryland — temporarily assigned to the United States Naval Academy for instruction of future naval officers — until June. Taken subsequently to the New York Navy Yard, she was decommissioned on 21 April 1908. Partially disassembled, she was then loaded onto the after well deck of the collier  for a voyage to the Philippines as deck cargo along with her sister ship  via the Suez Canal.

Arriving at the Naval Station at Cavite, Porpoise was launched on 8 July 1908, and recommissioned on 20 November. Due to the small size of Plunger-class boats, officers and men lived on board the gunboat .

Whiting's experiment
In April 1909, Ensign Kenneth Whiting, a future naval aviation pioneer, became the commanding officer of Porpoise. On 15 April, Whiting and his crew of six took the submarine out for what was to be a routine run. Porpoise got underway, cleared the dock and moved out into Manila Bay. Only then did Whiting reveal the purpose of the dive.

Convinced that a man could escape from a submarine through the torpedo tube, Whiting determined that he was going to try and test his theory with himself as a guinea pig. Squeezing into the 18 inch (450 mm) diameter tube, he clung to the crossbar which stiffened the outer torpedo tube door, as the crew closed the inner door. When the outer door was opened and water rushed in, Whiting hung onto the crossbar that drew his elbows out of the tube's mouth, and then muscled his way out using his hands and arms, the entire evolution consuming 77 seconds. He then swam to the surface, Porpoise surfacing soon thereafter. Reluctant to speak about the incident in public, he nevertheless informed his flotilla commander, Lt. Guy W.S. Castle, who submitted a report on how the feat had been accomplished. In Porpoise's log that day, Whiting had simply commented: "Whiting went through the torpedo tube, boat lying in (the) water in (a) normal condition, as an experiment..."

Asiatic fleet and later service
Subsequently, becoming a unit of the First Submarine Division, Asiatic Torpedo Fleet, on 9 December 1909, Porpoise continued her routine of local operations out of Cavite for the next decade. Renamed A-6 on 17 November 1911, she patrolled the entrance to Manila Bay and convoyed vessels out of port during World War I, under the command of Lt. A.H. Bailey. Placed in ordinary on 1 December 1918, she spent a little over a year in that status, until decommissioned on 12 December 1919 and turned over to the Commandant of the Naval Station at Cavite for disposal. Given the alphanumeric hull number SS-7 on 17 July 1920, A-6 was authorized for use as a target in July 1921 and as of 16 January 1922 was struck from the Naval Vessel Register.

References

 

Plunger-class submarines
World War I submarines of the United States
Ships built in Elizabeth, New Jersey
1901 ships
Ships sunk as targets